Charles Theodore Williams FRCP, MVO (29 August 1838 – 15 December 1912) was an English physician, known as a leading authority on pulmonary tuberculosis.

Biography
Charles Theodore, son of the famous physician C. J. B. Williams, was educated at Harrow School and Pembroke College, Oxford, where he received his bachelor's degree in 1860 and his M.A. in 1862. He studied medicine at St George's Hospital, Wandsworth and in Paris, receiving his M.B. in 1864. At Brompton Hospital, he became Assistant Physician in 1867, Physician in 1871, and resigned from the active staff in 1894, to become Consulting Physician. He was President of the Medical Society of London for the year 1889.

In 1868 he married Mary, daughter of John Gwyn Jeffreys.

Honours
1871 — Lettsomian Lecturer
1893 — Lumleian Lecturer
1906 — M.V.O.
1911 — Harveian Orator

Selected publications

with Charles James Blasius Williams:

References

External links

BBC – Your Paintings – (Charles) Theodore Williams (1838–1912)

1838 births
1912 deaths
19th-century English medical doctors
20th-century English medical doctors
Fellows of the Royal College of Physicians
People educated at Harrow School
Alumni of Pembroke College, Oxford
Presidents of the Royal Meteorological Society